2022 was the 61st edition of the annual Albanian music competition . It consisted of three semi-finals on 19, 20 and 21 December, respectively, and the final on 22 December 2022. The four live shows were hosted by Arbana Osmani. Elsa Lila with the song "Evita" resulted as the winner of the contest. For the first time, the Albanian representative in the Eurovision Song Contest 2023 was selected by the public, with Albina and Familja Kelmendi with "" emerging as the representative.

Format 

The four live shows were hosted by Albanian presenter Arbana Osmani and held at the Palace of Congresses in Tirana, Albania. Osmani directed the contest along with Bojken Lako, Eduart Grishaj, Eraldo Rexho and Shpëtim Saraçi.

Voting structure 

Prior to this, the winner was determined by a jury vote, which faced controversy due to allegations of nepotism and corruption. In response, the organisers of RTSH introduced a new system combining public and jury voting. While the top three and two prizes would continue to be chosen by the jury, the winner would no longer receive an invitation to participate in the Eurovision Song Contest. Instead, the Albanian representative for the contest would be selected through a separate televoting process.

Contestants 

Following the application process, a provisional list of 26 participants was published on 27 October, three days prior to the end of the application period.

Shows

Semi-finals 

The semi-finals of  took place on 19 December and 20 December 2022 and were broadcast live at 21:00 (CET) on the respective dates. Albanian actress Margarita Xhepa was the special guest of the first semi-final, performing a monologue to raise awareness about domestic violence against women and sharing her own experiences. Following the conclusion of the second semi-final, five out of ten contestants from the New artists were selected by a jury to advance to the final, while all 16 contestants from the Big artists automatically qualified for the final.

Nostalgia Night 

The nostalgia night of  took place on 21 December 2022 at 21:00 (CET).

Final 

The final of  took place on 22 December 2022 at 21:00 (CET). Albanian-Belgian singer Gala Dragot and Ukrainian group Kalush, who won the Eurovision Song Contest 2022, were the interval acts of the final. The jury, consisting of Alma Bektashi, Elton Deda, Genc Salihu, Jeani Ciko and Rita Petro, determined Elsa Lila with the song "Evita" as the winner of the contest. The Albanian representative for the Eurovision Song Contest 2023 was selected by televoting, with Albina and Familja Kelmendi with the song "" being named as the country's chosen representatives. Erma Mici received the award for the Best New Artist, while Rovena Dilo was awarded the Career Award.

Key:
 Winner
 Second place
 Third place

Broadcasts 

The four live shows of Festivali i Këngës were broadcast live from 19 December to 22 December 2022 on RTSH in Albania and Radio Televizioni i Kosovës (RTK) in Kosovo. RTSH further provided international live streaming of the shows through their official website, without any accompanying commentary.

See also 
Festivali i Këngës
Eurovision Song Contest 2023
Albania in the Eurovision Song Contest 2023

References 

2022
2022 in Albanian music
2022 in Albanian television
2022 song contests
December 2022 events in Europe
Eurovision Song Contest 2023